Recorded by Len Milne at 234 Main Street in Winnipeg, Manitoba, Canada, Live at the High & Lonesome Club is the fourth album from The Perpetrators. The follow-up to 2007's Tow Truck, it is the second Perpetrators' album to feature Chris "MAMA" Bauer on drums alongside founding members, J Nowicki and Ryan Menard.

Track listing
 "Off the Hook" (Jagger/Richards)
"Baltimore"
"One Year Ago"
"Happy Saturday"
"Malt Liquor"
"12,000 Miles"
"Quarter to Five" (featuring Joanna Miller)
"Toe Stub"
"Don't You Laugh at Me" (Chester "Howlin' Wolf" Burnett)
"Crack Whore Blues" (The Neckbones)
"Scratch the Surfish"
"Six Pack"
"She's Gone" (Theodore Roosevelt "Hound Dog" Taylor)
"She Asked Me (So I Told Her)" (T-Model Ford)
(all other songs written by The Perpetrators)

2008 live albums
The Perpetrators albums